Press Holdings and May Corporation Limited are two Jersey-registered holding companies owned by Frederick Barclay, which control the UK holding company Press Acquisitions Limited, which in turn owns the Telegraph Media Group, parent company of The Daily Telegraph and The Sunday Telegraph.

In December 2005, Press Holdings sold The Scotsman Publications to the Edinburgh-based Johnston Press for £160m, having paid £82m for the group in 1995.

The company also owns The Spectator, a weekly British political magazine, and Apollo, an art magazine.

References

 
Holding companies of the United Kingdom
David and Frederick Barclay